Sciaromiopsis is a genus of moss in the family Amblystegiaceae.

Species include:
 Sciaromiopsis brevifolia
 Sciaromiopsis nipponensis
 Sciaromiopsis sinensis (Broth.) Broth.

References

Moss genera
Hypnales
Taxonomy articles created by Polbot